The Kwekwe Sports Club in Kwekwe is the home ground of one of Zimbabwe's four provincial cricket sides, Mid West Rhinos. The cricket ground has been host to several first class and one day matches and has even hosted some internationals – most notably between Zimbabwe and Kenya in 2002. Kwekwe also hosts a variety of touring sides versus Zimbabwe 'A' teams.

In 2018 Kwekwe Sports Club formed a theatre section named KKSC Theatre. The theatre has performed three original plays since their inception with its next due in June 2020.

External links
 Kwekwe Sports Club at CricketArchive
 Profile by Cricinfo

Cricket grounds in Zimbabwe
Kwekwe
2003 Cricket World Cup stadiums
Buildings and structures in Midlands Province